Hockey Club Temirtau is a Kazakhstani ice hockey team based in Temirtau, Kazakhstan and play in the Kazakhstan Hockey Championship, the top level of ice hockey in Kazakhstan. They serve as the minor league affiliate of Saryarka Karagandy, who plays in the Russian-based Supreme Hockey League. Founded in 2012 as Saryarka–2, they became Berkut in 2013 and Temirtau in 2015.

Season-by-season record
Note: GP = Games played, W = Wins, L = Losses, T = Ties, OTW = Overtime/shootout wins, OTL = Overtime/shootout losses, Pts = Points, GF = Goals for, GA = Goals against

References

Ice hockey teams in Kazakhstan
Saryarka Karagandy